(+)-Costunolide is a naturally occurring sesquiterpene lactone, first isolated in Saussurea costus roots in 1960. It is also found in lettuce.

Synthesis
It is synthesized through the mevalonate pathway, seen in Figure 1. The synthesis begins with the cyclization of compound 1, farnesyl pyrophosphate (FPP),  which is mediated by a sesquiterpene cyclase, (+)-germacrene A synthase, to form compound 2, (+)-germacryl cation.  Inside this same enzyme, a proton is lost to form 3, (+)-germacrene A.  The isoprenyl side chain of (+)-germacrene A is then hydroxylated by (+)-germacrene A hydroxylase, which is a cytochrome P450 enzyme, to form 4.  NAD(P)+  dependent hydrogenase(s) then oxidize 4, germacra-1(10),4,11(13)-trien-12-ol, through the intermediate 5, germacra-1(10),4,11(13)-trien-12-al to form compound 6, germacrene acid.  The cyctochrome P450 enzyme, (+)-costunolide synthase, which is a NADPH and O2 dependent enzyme, then oxidizes germacrene acid to give the alcohol intermediate, 7, which then cyclizes to form the lactone 8, (+)-costunolide.

Figure 1. Biosynthesis of (+)-Costunolide.

References 

Sesquiterpene lactones
Vinylidene compounds